Parnell was a station on the Chicago Transit Authority's Englewood branch, which is now part of the Green Line. The station was located at South Parnell Avenue and 63rd Place in the Englewood neighborhood of Chicago. Parnell had a direct platform connection to the adjacent Chicago and Western Indiana Railroad station. Parnell opened on December 24, 1906, and closed on July 31, 1949.

References

Defunct Chicago "L" stations
Railway stations in the United States opened in 1906
Railway stations closed in 1949
1906 establishments in Illinois
1949 disestablishments in Illinois
Railway stations in Chicago